Anthene lachares, the silky ciliate blue, is a butterfly in the family Lycaenidae. It is found in Sierra Leone, Liberia, Ivory Coast, Ghana, Nigeria, Cameroon, Gabon, the Republic of the Congo, the Central African Republic, Angola, the Democratic Republic of the Congo and Uganda. The habitat consists of primary forests and dense secondary forests.

Adult males mud-puddle.

The larvae are green and onisciform (woodlouse shaped), but become reddish with oblique lighter stripes just before pupation. They are usually found under leaves in groups of two to eight and are always attended by ants, including Pheidole aurivillii race kasaiensis and Pheidole rotundata.

Subspecies
Anthene lachares lachares (Sierra Leone, Liberia, Ivory Coast, Ghana, Nigeria: south and Cross River loop, Cameroon, Gabon, Congo, Central African Republic, Angola, western Democratic Republic of the Congo)
Anthene lachares toroensis Stempffer, 1947 (Central African Republic: Bangui, Democratic Republic of the Congo: east to Ituri, western Uganda)

References

Butterflies described in 1878
Anthene
Butterflies of Africa
Taxa named by William Chapman Hewitson